Baliochila nguru is a butterfly in the family Lycaenidae. It is found in Tanzania (in the Nguru Mountains). Its habitat consists of primary forests at altitudes between 1,200 and 1,400 metres.

References

Butterflies described in 1986
Poritiinae
Endemic fauna of Tanzania
Butterflies of Africa